Larry Ross (born 15 June 1954 in Christchurch, New Zealand) is a former speedway rider who rode with the Wimbledon Dons, Belle Vue Aces, Halifax Dukes and the Bradford Dukes in the British League.

Career summary
Ross began riding at the Ruapuna track in Christchurch in 1972. He moved to England in 1975 and joined the Wimbledon Dons. He won the London Riders' Championship. In 1979 he was a member of the New Zealand team which won the World Team Cup. He was also a non-riding reserve for the 1979 World Final (won for a record 6th time by fellow Kiwi rider Ivan Mauger).

In 1980 he was third in the British League Riders' Championship and the following year he rode in the World Championship final at Wembley. From 1977 to 1986 he rode in eight finals of the World Pairs Championship with Ivan Mauger and Mitch Shirra. Riding with Mauger he was runnerup in 1978 and in 1981.

During his long career, Larry Ross won the New Zealand Championship a record nine times. 
In 2006 he came out of retirement to win the New Zealand long track championship.

World Final Appearances

Individual World Championship
 1979 -  Chorzów, Silesian Stadium - reserve - did not ride
 1981 -  London, Wembley Stadium - 13th - 4pts

World Pairs Championship
 1977 -  Manchester, Hyde Road (with Ivan Mauger) - 5th - 17pt (1)
 1978 -  Chorzów, Silesian Stadium (with Ivan Mauger) - 2nd - 24pt (12)
 1979 -  Vojens, Vojens Speedway Center (with Ivan Mauger) - 6th - 12pt (6)
 1980 -  Krsko, Matija Gubec Stadium (with Ivan Mauger) - 5th - 16pt (5)
 1981 -  Chorzów, Silesian Stadium (with Ivan Mauger) - 2nd - 22pt (10)
 1982 -  Sydney, Liverpool City Raceway (with Mitch Shirra) - 6th - 13pt (8)
 1983 -  Gothenburg, Ullevi (with Ivan Mauger) - 7th - 11pt (4)
 1986 -  Pocking, Rottalstadion (with Mitch Shirra) - 5th - 32pt (20)

World Team Cup
 1979 -  London, White City (with Ivan Mauger / Mitch Shirra / Bruce Cribb / Roger Abel) - Winner - 35pt (11)

References

External links
Speedway New Zealand - NZ championship results

1954 births
Living people
New Zealand speedway riders
Wimbledon Dons riders
Halifax Dukes riders
Bradford Dukes riders